Erkan Mustafa (born 14 May 1970) is a British actor and television presenter of Turkish Cypriot descent, most noted for the part of Roland Browning in Grange Hill (BBC 1982–1987).

Other parts include "Enormous Orphan" in Blackadder's Christmas Carol (1988) and "Otto" in Chef! (1991).

In 1993 Channel 4's The Word tracked him down to a friend's record shop where he was helping out. He appeared on This Morning'''s Grange Hill reunion in 1998. In 2005 he appeared in the reunion programme Bring Back Grange Hill.

Mustafa occasionally works in television with fellow Grange Hill star Lee MacDonald including as a presenter for E4 Music.

In October 2009, Mustafa hosted a Grange Hill cast reunion at Sound'' nightclub in London's Leicester Square.

He acted in The All-Nighter, a 10 minute short film released in 2018, along with Ronald Forfar and Martin Hancock.

Filmography

References

External links 
 
The Venue TV Show Facebook page
 The Venue TV Show Twitter page
Grange Hill Online
Grange Hill Cast Charity Reunion 2009

1970 births
Living people
English male child actors
English male television actors
British people of Turkish Cypriot descent
Male actors from London
20th-century English male actors